"The Snake" is a song written and first recorded by civil-rights activist Oscar Brown in 1963; it became a hit single for American singer Al Wilson in 1968.

In the U.S., the hit version of "The Snake" was released in 1968, on Johnny Rivers' Soul City Records. (Rivers had released his own version of the song on his 1966 album ...And I Know You Wanna Dance). Wilson's single made the Top 30 on the Billboard Hot 100 in 1968 and, due to exposure on the UK Northern Soul scene, made the UK Singles Chart in August 1975 when reissued, reaching No.41 in September. The success of "The Snake" on the northern soul nightclub circuit has led to it being ranked 4 of 500 top northern soul singles and for it to appear on over 30 pop and northern soul compilation albums.  
The song was re-released in 1989 as a B-side to a re-release of "Just Don't Want to Be Lonely" by The Main Ingredient. Wilson's recording of "The Snake" was also featured in a Lambrini television advertisement in the UK.

Chart history

In Popular Culture
The song was featured in Season 4, Episode 25 of the television show Northern Exposure, "Old Tree". It was sung by Cindy Geary in her role as the character Shelly. The episode originally aired on May 24, 1993.

Use by Donald Trump
The song gained renewed attention during the campaign for the 2016 United States presidential election.  Republican candidate Donald Trump read its lyrics at several campaign rallies to illustrate his position on illegal immigration, claiming that the decision to allow people claiming refugee status to enter the United States would "come back to bite us", as happened to the woman who took in the snake in the song. "The Snake" has been characterized as "a celebration of black culture and a repudiation of racism", and suggestions have been made that the snake in the song refers to a white person.  Two of Brown's seven children asked Trump to stop using their late father's song, telling the media: "He's perversely using 'The Snake' to demonize immigrants" and that Brown "never had anything against immigrants". Despite a cease and desist letter, Trump has continued reciting the lyrics at rallies as recently as June 2021.

See also
 The Farmer and the Viper

References

External links
 
Lyrics

1963 songs
1968 singles
1974 singles
1989 singles
Al Wilson (singer) songs
Bell Records singles
Northern soul songs